The obturator vein begins in the upper portion of the adductor region of the thigh and enters the pelvis through the upper part of the obturator foramen, in the obturator canal.

It runs backward and upward on the lateral wall of the pelvis below the obturator artery, and then passes between the ureter and the hypogastric artery, to end in the hypogastric vein.

It has an anterior and posterior branch (similar to obturator artery).

Additional images

References 

Veins of the torso